Diogo de Melo Coutinho was a Portuguese navigator, co-discoverer of the Azores Islands.

Biography
Born 1450 in Portugal, of noble family Diogo de Melo married to Joana de Carvalho, also daughter of nobles.

Diogo de Melo Coutinho was the discoverer of the Azores Islands together with Gonçalo Velho Cabral.

References

External links
https://web.archive.org/web/20070702012748/http://www.artigas.org.uy/bibliotecas/ba/049.Artigas/Pags.%20del%201%20al%20106.pdf

1450 births
15th-century Portuguese people
Portuguese explorers
Portuguese navigators
Medieval Portuguese nobility
Year of death missing